This is an incomplete list of Australian Catholic University people, including alumni and staff.

Alumni
Notable alumni of the Australian Catholic University and its predecessor colleges include:
 James Ajaka, former CEO, Nudie Juice
 Camille Agnes Becker Paul, feminist, moral theologian and activist
 Matt Burke, Australian rugby union player
 Martin Dixon, former Victorian Minister for Education
 Pippa Hallas, CEO of Ella Baché
 Des Hasler, former professional rugby league footballer and coach of Canterbury-Bankstown Bulldogs
James Tedesco, NRL Fullback for the Sydney Roosters
 Justin Madden, former AFL player; Victorian state minister 
 Peter Maher, CEO of St Vincent de Paul Queensland
 Melina Marchetta, bestselling author of Looking for Alibrandi
 Morris West, writer
 Alan Whiticker, published author and rugby league historian
Meg Lanning, Australian cricketer who plays for and captains the national team as well as the Melbourne Stars and the Victoria women's cricket team

Faculty

 Pauline Allen, early Christianity
 Frank Brennan, professor of law, Institute of Legal Studies; Living National Treasure
 Shane Clifton, Pentecostal theologian
 Muredach Dynan, Professor of Education and Pro Vice-Chancellor
 Brian Fitzgerald, barrister, academic and legal researcher
 Raimond Gaita, professor of philosophy at ACU National and King's College London; author of Romulus, My Father.
 Michele Riondino, Director of ACU's Canon Law Centre, Professor of Canon Law and Children's Rights

Administration

List of chancellors

List of vice-chancellors

References

 
Australian Catholic